Neurovision is Belgian electronic band Telex's second album, released in 1980.

Track listing

References

External links
 

1980 albums
Telex (band) albums